This is a List of cable operators in Pakistan. Television operators are regulated by the Pakistan Electronic Media Regulatory Authority).

References

Cable television companies of Pakistan